Larry Chimbole (May 22, 1919 – November 10, 2015) was a United States Army veteran of World War II, California politician, and a member of the Democratic party.

Early life 
On May 22, 1919, Chimbole was born in New Haven, Connecticut. In 1937, Chimbole graduated from Stamford High School.

Career 
Chimbole was an owner of a hardware store in Palmdale, California.

In 1961, Chimbole became the President of Palmdale Chamber of Commerce.

In 1962, after Palmdale was incorporated, Chimbole was elected as the first mayor of Palmdale, California.

On November 5, 1974, Chimbole won the election and became a Democratic member of California State Assembly for District 34. Chimboles defeated Kenneth F. Hall and Jack E. Ashworth with 51.7% of the votes. In 1976, as an incumbent, Chimbole won the election and continued serving his district. Chimbole narrowly defeated Phil Wyman, vice president of the Antelope Valley Board of Trade. In 1978, however, Wyman came back to beat Chimbole.

From 1996 to 2000 Chimbole was a member of the Antelope Valley Hospital District Board.

Personal life 
After WWII, Chimbole, lived in Glendale, California. In 1945, Chimbole adopted Harold Steven Chimbole (1943-2020). In 1957, Chimbole moved to Palmdale, California.

Chimbole's wife was "Vicki" Lelia (nee Roberson) Chimbole (1936-2011), a real estate broker with Robertson Realty. They have four children.

On November 10, 2015, Chimbole died in Palmdale, California. He was 96 years old. Chimbole is interned at Desert Lawn Memorial Park in Palmdale, California.

Legacy 
 The Larry Chimbole Cultural Center is located in Palmdale, California.
 The First Mayor, a bronze statue of Chimbole on a bench in Poncitlàn Square was dedicated on October 8, 2015.

Electoral history

References

1919 births
2015 deaths
Military personnel from New Haven, Connecticut
People from Palmdale, California
Glendale Community College (California) alumni
United States Army personnel of World War II
California city council members
Mayors of places in California
Democratic Party members of the California State Assembly
Politicians from New Haven, Connecticut